The 2023 World Junior Ice Hockey Championship Division III was an international ice hockey tournament organized by the International Ice Hockey Federation. It consisted of one pool of eight teams separated into groups A and B. The winner of this tournament will be promoted to the 2024 World Junior Ice Hockey Championships – Division II Group B.

To be eligible as a junior player in this tournament, a player cannot be born earlier than 2003.

Participating teams

Match officials
Five referees and ten linesmen were selected for the tournament.

Referees
 Nicholas Air
 Murat Aygun
 Bostjan Groznik
 Yen-Chin Shen
 Chris van Grinsven

Linesmen
 Berkay Aslanbey
 Ferhat Dogus Aygun
 Thibo Christiaens
 Yunjie Cui
 John Dow
 Taha Kavlakoglu
 Aron Magyar
 Sem Ramirez
 Kaspars Sirins
 Chun Hang Wong

First round

Group A

Group B

Playoffs
All teams enter the quarterfinals; Semifinals are to be re-seeded.

Quarterfinals

Semifinals

7th place match

5th place match

3rd place match

Final

Final standings

References

III
World Junior Ice Hockey Championships – Division III
World Junior Ice Hockey Championships
World Junior Ice Hockey Championships
World Junior Ice Hockey Championships